Ambrose Lake is a lake in Algoma District, Ontario, Canada. The primary outflow is an unnamed creek to Iron Lake, part of the Dog River system.

See also
List of lakes in Ontario

References

Lakes of Algoma District